Xenos is a genus of insects belonging to the family Xenidae. The word derives from the Greek word for strange. A species of the genus is Xenos vesparum, first described by Pietro Rossi in 1793. The females are permanent entomophagous endoparasites of Polistes paper wasps. They dwell their whole lives in the abdomens of wasps.

Species
These 33 species belong to the genus Xenos:

 Xenos afer Pasteels, 1950 (Africa)
 Xenos americanus (Brèthes, 1923) (South America)
 Xenos argentinus Brèthes, 1923 (South America)
 Xenos boharti Hofmann, 1965 (South America)
 Xenos bohlsi Hoffmann, 1914 (South America)
 Xenos bonairensis Brèthes, 1923 (South America)
 Xenos circularis Kifune & Maeta, 1985 (Asia)
 Xenos colombiensis Cook, Mayorga-Ch & Sarmiento, 2020
 Xenos dianshuiwengi Yang, 1999
 Xenos formosanus Kifune & Maeta, 1985 (Asia)
 Xenos hamiltoni Kathirithamby & Hughes, 2006 (Central America and Mexico)
 Xenos hebraei Kinzelbach, 1978 (Palearctic)
 Xenos hospitus Oliveira & Kogan, 1962 (South America)
 Xenos hunteri (Pierce, 1909) (North America)
 Xenos indespectus Oliveira & Kogan, 1962 (South America)
 Xenos iviei Kifune, 1983
 Xenos kifunei Cook & Mathison, 1997 (North America)
 Xenos moutoni Buysson, 1903 (Southern Asia and temperate Asia)
 Xenos niger Pasteels, 1950 (Africa)
 Xenos nigrescens Brues, 1903 (North America and South America)
 Xenos oxyodontes Nakase & Kato, 2013 (Southern Asia)
 Xenos pallidus Brues, 1903 (North America)
 Xenos peckii Kirby, 1813
 Xenos peruensis Kifune, 1979 (South America)
 Xenos provesparum Kifune, 1986 (Southern Asia and tropical Asia)
 Xenos ropalidiae (Kinzelbach, 1975)
 Xenos rostratus Trois, 1984 (South America)
 Xenos rubiginosi (Pierce, 1909) (North America)
 Xenos stuckenbergi Pasteels, 1956 (Africa)
 Xenos vesparum (Rossi, 1793) (Palearctic and Africa)
 Xenos yamaneorum Kifune & Maeta, 1985 (Asia)
 Xenos yangi Dong, Liu & Li, 2022
 Xenos zavattarii (Pierce, 1911) (Africa)

References

Strepsiptera
Endoparasites
Insect genera
Taxa named by Pietro Rossi
Parasites of Hymenoptera